Timothy Nelson is an Australian singer-songwriter from Western Australia. Nelson has performed under the name Timothy Nelson & The Infidels.

Career

2006–2014: I Know This Now & Terror Terror, Hide It Hide It 
In 2007, Nelson won Upper Secondary Song of the Year Grand Prize at the WAM Song of the Year with the song "Overcast Day".

In 2010, the band released "You Don't Know What You're Waiting for" with Beat Magazine saying "Nelson sings about the fitful impatience of youth, the uncertainty that plagues teenagers as they stand around waiting for their lives to start, hating themselves a little bit, certain that something amazing is waiting for them just over the horizon. A simple, reasonably effective tune." 
 
In June 2011 album, Timothy Nelson & The Infidels released the album I Know This Now, which Nelson said I used to write a lot of love songs, which ended up being the main body of the album...I definitely went through a period of writing those kinds of tunes. You kind of write about what you feel comfortable writing about. I think that's probably half the reason why I started writing songs in the first place: you either write about that stuff or don't end up talking about it at all. And that doesn't sound healthy,” 
 
In July 2014, the band released Terror Terror, Hide It Hide It. Cam Findlay from The Music’ gave the album 4 out of 5.

In 2014, the band won five WA Music awards out of seven nomination.

2015–present: Solo work and Words Like Young
In 2015, Nelson co-wrote and produced songs for the kids' television series The Shapes, an animated series of short music videos appearing on ABC TV. The series took home the Western Australian Screen Academy (WASA) award for Outstanding Achievement in Animation. 
 
In November 2016, Nelson released his debut solo album, Words Like Young. The Music said it's "A brilliant solo debut" and Rolling Stone called it "A wonderfully personal, yet inviting release".
 
In March 2020, Nelson released "Your House", which Nelson said "It's basically about having no money, but knowing a friend that does, and inviting yourself over to their house so you can enjoy the day like a boss". This was followed by "Biding Time" and July, "Summer They Say" in September 2020 and "Working Weekend" in October 2020 all set to appear on a new album set for release in 2021.

Discography

Studio albums

Singles

Awards and nominations

WAM Song of the Year
The WAM Song of the Year was formed by the  Western Australian Rock Music Industry Association Inc. (WARMIA) in 1985, with its main aim to develop and run annual awards recognising achievements within the music industry in Western Australia.

|-
| 2007
| "Overcast Day"
| Upper Secondary Song of the Year Grand Prize
| 
|-
| 2009
| "Sleeping Alone"
| Country Song of the Year Grand Prize
| 
|-
| rowspan="2"| 2011
| rowspan="2"| "Speak the Truth in Love"
| Song of the Year Grand Prize
| 
|-
| Love Song of the Year
| 
|-
| 2021
| "Biding Time"
| Folk Song of the Year
| 
|-
|}

West Australian Music Industry Awards
The West Australian Music Industry Awards (WAMIs) are annual awards presented to the local contemporary music industry, put on annually by the Western Australian Music Industry Association Inc (WAM). Nelson has won six awards.
 (wins only)
|-
| 2013
| Timothy Nelson & The Infidels
| Best Folk Act 
| 
|-
| rowspan="4"| 2014
| Timothy Nelson & The Infidels
| Best Pop Act
| 
|-
| Terror Terror, Hide It Hide It
| Best Album
| 
|-
| rowspan="2"|  Timothy Nelson
| Best Male Vocalist
| 
|-
| Best Keys / Synth 
| 
|-
| 2016
| Timothy Nelson
| Best Keys / Synth 
| 
|-

References

Living people
21st-century Australian singers
21st-century Australian male singers
Year of birth missing (living people)